Al-Tighnari (meaning "from Tignar", ; full name: Abu Abdullah Muhammad ibn Malik al-Murri al-Tighnari al-Gharnati) was an Andalusian Arab Muslim agronomist, botanist, poet, traveler, and physician. Al-Tighnari wrote a treatise on agronomy called Zuhrat al-Bustān wa-Nuzhat al-Adhhān. In the book, he described his journey to the Middle East and shared his observations on agriculture and other topics.

Al-Tighnari traveled a lot and wrote about his adventures in his book. He visited many places, including various towns in al-Andalus, Salé (Morocco), Bani Hammad Fort (Algeria), Egypt, and the Levant. He also went to the Hijaz and performed the Hajj. In his writing, he described what he saw in each place. For example, he wrote about how long the trees grew in Egypt and how the Abraham's Well in Palestine were dug.

Biography
Abu Abdullah Muhammad ibn Malik al-Murri al-Tighnari al-Gharnati was born into an Arab family of Banu Murra, in a small, disappeared village of Tignar, located between the existing Albolote and Maracena, in the province of Granada, Al-Andalus (modern day Spain). His year of birth and death is unknown, but he was alive between 1075 and 1118.

Al-Tighnari was a literary man and poet who lived during the time of Zirid dynasty under Abdallah ibn Buluggin. He was one of many personalities from Granada who moved to the Taifa of Almería, likely because of disagreements with the ruler. He was part of a group of poets and scientists at the royal court of the Banu Sumadih. In the gardens of the royal residence, al-Sumadihiyya, he did different types of agricultural experiments.

Al-Tighnari moved to Seville after the Almoravids conquered Granada and is said to have pursued his studies there in 1100. In Seville, he was part of Ibn Bassal's group of agronomists and botanists. He became part of a group of poets and naturalists in the Sevillian court who were studying under common masters, including the Toledo agronomist Ibn Bassal and the Sevillian physician Abu l-Hasan Sihab. It's possible that he also studied under Ibn al-Lunquh or Ibn Luengo, a physician from Toledo who was a disciple of Ibn Bassal.

Al-Tighnari then travelled to various towns in al-Andalus, North Africa, and the East. He established contact with other intellectual centers of the time located at various points along the route. After staying at Bani Hammad fort, he continued his journey through the eastern Mediterranean, passing through Tripoli, Alexandria and several Syrian cities, including Damascus. He observed and studied the agricultural and hydraulic practices in these places with the intention of applying them in al-Andalus. Since he is mentioned as al-Hajj al-Gharnati in Ibn al-'Awwam's treatise on agronomy, it is likely that he made the Hajj at some point.

Later, after going to various places in North Africa and the East, he came back to al-Andalus and would live in Granada and Seville alternately.

He wrote a treatise on agronomy entitled Zuhrat al-Bustān wa-Nuzhat al-Adhhān for the Almoravid prince Tamim, son of Yusuf Ibn Tashufin. Prince Tamim was governor of the province of Granada and patron of Al-Tighnari and other agronomists and botanists.

In Expiración García Sánchez's description of Al-Tighnari, she paints him as a "fine writer" with a terse, spare style. Although she has only fragments of his poetry and prose, she believes that they provide a good indication of his writing ability. She also suggests that he may have been a physician, based on the detailed knowledge of medicine shown in his treatise, but she does not have any certain evidence that he ever practiced this skill.

Ibn Bassam and Ibn Al-Khatib have both written poetry on Al-Tighnari in his time.

Al-Tighnari died in Granada and buried there. He instructed that on his tomb should be written:

Major work on agronomy 

Al-Tighnari wrote a work on agronomy, Zuhrat al-Bustān wa-Nuzhat al-Adhhān in 1100. It was dedicated to the Almoravid governor of Granada, Abu Tahir Tamim ibn Yusuf Ibn Tashufin. The original text had 12 books and 360 chapters, but only an incomplete version is known today. There are at most eleven copies of the work, which lack the first part. The contents of the work are largely similar to other Andalusian works on agriculture. The book is a systematic guide to agronomical science that includes an astronomical and meteorological calendar, valuable linguistic, toponymic and botanical information, and, at the end of each profile on a particular plant or tree, a section on its properties, both beneficial and harmful, from a therapeutic and dietary perspective.

He starts by discussing different types of soil, fertilizers, and hydrology, and then provides practical advice on how to manage a household. He follows this up with chapters on plant growth, including planting, sowing, and grafting, as well as how to deal with diseases and other agricultural tasks.

His travel throughout the Middle East 
Al-Tighnari described his travels in the book in many places, mentioning, for example, the city of Salé, Morocco and the fortress of Bani Hammad, Algeria. He then headed east to Egypt, and perhaps from there to the Hijaz, Saudi Arabia and performed the Hajj. In his writing on agriculture (al-Hina'), he mentioned that he visited Egypt and saw how long the trees there grew, saying: "I saw it in the land of Egypt, and in the land of the Levant, which was planted 25 years ago, and the trees grew on the legs of a man like the son of Adam". He then traveled to the land of the Levant and visited many of its cities. He mentions that he saw the city of Ashkelon, one of the cities of Palestine, and described the well-known Abraham's well. He witnessed how the wells were dug and how the columns were erected on them. He also mentioned Damascus more than once. For example, in his speech on the cultivation of fennel, he said: "And I saw fennel in Damascus, Syria, in the shape of a red leaf, and I did not see it anywhere else." He also pointed out that he visited the city of Aleppo, Syria and saw what was planted there, and the methods and methods of agriculture. He mentioned during his writing on cotton that: "And I saw it in Aleppo for a period of 30 years and more".

Views on his works 
He was a poet and a scholar. Ibn Bassam said: "I did not mention this man except for verses of his poetry, and two paragraphs of his prose, and he referred to the tree with one of its fruits."

He follows the techniques described in The Nabataean Agriculture closely, though he does not follow the theosophical part which is developed alongside them throughout the latter work. In al-Tighnari's treatise, he includes accounts of personal experiences, sometimes contrasted with, techniques learned in his journeys through Syria and Tunisia.

The book also depicts the fertile plain of Granada, which is bordered by high plateaus. These plateaus are cold climate areas that are used to cultivate a variety of wheat and other cereal crops. On the coastal strip from Almeria to Malaga, there are cultivations that use agricultural techniques that are similar to those used today for sugar cane and some citrus crops.

It's possible that the last book in the series, which is not included in any of the existing manuscripts, was devoted to animal husbandry, as is the case in similar treatises by Ibn al-'Awwam and Ibn Wafid, it is not certain.

Al-Tighnari uses a variety of sources. He was in turn used as a source by other authors such as Ibn al-'Awwam and Ibn Luyun.

Expiración García Sánchez describes Al-Tighnari's work as systematic and detailed. She also says that it is a "specifically Andalusian text" because he includes many elements on local agricultural practices and the various types of plants found in different regions of al-Andalus.

References

Notes

External links
 The Filāḥa Texts Project: Al-Ṭighnarī

12th-century agronomists
Botanists of the medieval Islamic world
Physicians from al-Andalus
11th-century Arabs
12th-century Arabs